Albert Nyathi (born 15 November 1962 at Kafusi in Gwanda District in Matabeleland South) is a Zimbabwean poet, musician, writer, actor, and philanthropist who is particularly famous for the poem and song "Senzeni na?", which he composed following the assassination of Chris Hani. Nyathi is married to Caroline and they have  three children together.

Education 
For his secondary education, Nyathi attended Msitheli Secondary School and Matopo High School. He then attended the University of Zimbabwe where he graduated with an honors degree in English literature in the mid-1990s.

Career 
Nyathi started praise poetry as a very young boy where he used to sing praise poetry while herding cattle in Gwanda. Over the years, he has expanded his audience to include other African countries and countries outside the Africa continent. Nyathi performed in South Africa saying praises about the Great King of the Ndebele and founder of the Mthwakazi Kingdom, Mzilikazi. He has toured several countries including Botswana, Zambia, United States, Russia, Denmark, the Netherlands, and South Africa.

Published books 
 My Son
 My Daughter

Footnotes

1962 births
Living people
People from Matabeleland South Province
Northern Ndebele people
Zimbabwean artists
University of Zimbabwe alumni
Zimbabwean poets

Zimbabwean musicians